Krzysztof Jan Gadowski (born 14 August 1962 in Bochnia) is a Polish politician. He was elected to the Sejm on 25 September 2005, getting 7705 votes in 30 Rybnik district as a candidate from the Civic Platform list.

See also
Members of Polish Sejm 2005-2007

External links
Krzysztof Gadowski - parliamentary page - includes declarations of interest, voting record, and transcripts of speeches.

Civic Platform politicians
1962 births
Living people
Members of the Polish Sejm 2005–2007
Members of the Polish Sejm 2007–2011
Members of the Polish Sejm 2011–2015
Members of the Polish Sejm 2015–2019
Members of the Polish Sejm 2019–2023
University of Silesia in Katowice alumni